Maury Glacier is a glacier  wide, flowing in an east-northeast direction to the southwest corner of Violante Inlet, on the east coast of Palmer Land, Antarctica. It was discovered and photographed from the air in December 1940 by members of the United States Antarctic Service. During 1947 the glacier was photographed from the air by the Ronne Antarctic Research Expedition, who in conjunction with the Falkland Islands Dependencies Survey (FIDS) charted it from the ground. It was named by the FIDS for Matthew F. Maury, an American naval officer and hydrographer who was a distinguished promoter of maritime research and Antarctic exploration.

See also
Heirtzler Ice Piedmont

References

Glaciers of Palmer Land